Milcho Rusev (1924 – 6 August 2006) was a Bulgarian cyclist. He competed in three events at the 1952 Summer Olympics.

References

1924 births
2006 deaths
Bulgarian male cyclists
Olympic cyclists of Bulgaria
Cyclists at the 1952 Summer Olympics
Sportspeople from Sliven